The Northwest Georgia Amphitheatre (originally known as the Northwest Georgia Bank Amphitheatre) is an outdoor amphitheater located in Ringgold, Georgia, near Chattanooga, Tennessee. Construction on the venue began in 2004 on land owned by Catoosa County, using $550,000 in funds donated by the Northwest Georgia Bank Foundation. The amphitheater opened in 2007 with a three-day Sunset Concert featuring country artist John Anderson.

See also
 List of contemporary amphitheatres

References

External links
 Official Site

Amphitheaters in the United States
Buildings and structures in Catoosa County, Georgia
Music venues in Georgia (U.S. state)